Yrjö Antero Karilas (3 January 1891 – 7 June 1982) was a Finnish writer. He is most known for his Pikkujättiläinen book series.

Short biography 
Yrjö Karilas was born at Hailuoto on 3 January 1891. He passed his Matriculation examination in 1908. In 1911, he started teaching Russian at Helsinki. After the language was removed from the curriculum, he became an office employee at WSOY's Helsinki office. He oversaw the publication of multiple informative books, the most well-known being Pikkujättiläinen (literally "little giant"), published for the first time in 1924.

Books
 Antero Vipunen; arvoitusten ja ongelmien, leikkien ja pelien sekä eri harrastusalojen pikku jättiläinen
 Koululaisen muistikirja IX
 Koululaisen muistikirja XXVI
 Koululaisen muistikirja XXVIII
 Mieleni minun tekevi; askartelun ja kokeilun, keräilyn ja retkeilyn sekä eri harrastusalojen pikku jättiläinen

References

External links
 
 

1891 births
1982 deaths
People from Hailuoto
Writers from Northern Ostrobothnia
Finnish writers